Julien Leclercq (born 3 February 2003) is a Belgian professional snooker player.

Leclercq turned professional in 2022 after winning the Q Tour Playoff and gained a two-year tour card for the 2022–23 and 2023–24 snooker seasons.

Performance and rankings timeline

Career finals

Ranking finals: 1

Team finals: 2 (1 title)

Amateur finals: 4 (1 title)

References

External links
Julien Leclercq at wst.tv
Julien Leclercq at WPBSA snookerscores.net

2003 births
Living people
Belgian snooker players
21st-century Belgian people